Chichaoua is a province in the Moroccan region of Marrakesh-Safi. Its population in 2004 was 339,818 

The major cities and towns are: 
 Chichaoua
 Sidi Zouine
 Imintanut
 Sid L Mukhtar

Subdivisions
The province is divided administratively into the following:

References

 
Chichaoua Province